was a Japanese actress and film director.

Life
Hidari was born  in Asahi, Toyama, as the eldest of 8 children. She graduated from Tokyo Women's College of Physical Education and gave her film debut in 1952 in Wakaki hi no ayamachi. Between 1952 and 1995, she appeared in more than 90 films under the direction of filmmakers such as Tadashi Imai, Shōhei Imamura and Paul Schrader. In 1964, she won the Silver Bear for Best Actress at the 14th Berlin International Film Festival for her roles in She and He and The Insect Woman. In 1977, she directed and starred in the film The Far Road, which made her the first woman actor–director since Kinuyo Tanaka, and was entered into the 28th Berlin International Film Festival. Hidari also appeared on stage and television. She died of lung cancer in 2001.

Hidari was married to director Susumu Hani from 1959 to 1977, with whom she had one daughter, Mio Hani. Her sister is actress Tokie Hidari.

Selected filmography

 An Inn at Osaka (1954)
 The Maid's Kid (1955)
 The Balloon (1956)
 Mahiru no ankoku (1956)
 Sun in the Last Days of the Shogunate (1957)
 Warm Current (1957)
 The Boy Who Came Back (1958)
 Ballad of the Cart (1959)
 A Woman's Testament (1960)
 The Demon of Mount Oe (1960)
 The Insect Woman (1963)
 She and He (1963)
 A Fugitive from the Past (1965)
 The Wild Sea (1969)
 Faire l'amour : De la pilule à l'ordinateur (1971, also co-dir., anthology film)
 Under the Flag of the Rising Sun (1972)
 Barefoot Gen (1976)
 The Far Road (1977, also dir.)
 The Love Suicides at Sonezaki (1978)
 Mishima: A Life in Four Chapters (1985)

Awards
 1955: Mainichi Film Award for Best Supporting Actress for Ofukuro and Jinsei tombo gaeri
 1963: Blue Ribbon Award for Best Actress and Mainichi Film Award for Best Actress for The Insect Woman and She and He
 1964: Silver Bear for Best Actress and Kinema Junpo Award for Best Actress for The Insect Woman and She and He
 1965: Mainichi Film Award for Best Actress for A Fugitive from the Past
 1967: Mainichi Film Award for Best Supporting Actress for Onna no issho and Harubiyori
 2001: Mainichi Film Special Award for her lifetime achievement

References

External links
 
 

1930 births
2001 deaths
20th-century Japanese actresses
Japanese film actresses
Japanese film directors
Japanese women film directors
People from Toyama (city)
Deaths from lung cancer in Japan
Silver Bear for Best Actress winners